Artificial vision may refer to:

Computer vision
Visual prosthesis